Soul music is a musical genre, closely related to rhythm and blues, which grew out of the African-American gospel and blues traditions during the late 1950s and early 1960s in the United States.

Soul music may also refer to:
 Soul Music (novel), the title of a Discworld novel by Terry Pratchett
 Soul Music (TV series), animated TV Series based on the novel by Terry Pratchett
 Soul Music (radio series), BBC Radio 4 series about the emotional impact of music
 Soul Music, Dru Hill band member Woody Rock's 2002 gospel album